Josef Bergmaier (5 March 1909 – 5 March 1943) was a German footballer who played as a forward. Bergmaier played for three clubs in his hometown, Munich - TV 1888, FC Wacker, and, most notably, FC Bayern Munich, where he won the 1932 German football championship, scoring both goals in the final against Eintracht Frankfurt. Between 1930 and 1933 he won 8 caps for Germany, scoring once, in a 2–2 draw with Norway in 1932.

Bergmaier fought in World War II, and died in the Eastern Front on his 34th birthday. His former teammate Franz Krumm died in similar circumstances four days later.

External links

1909 births
1943 deaths
People from the Kingdom of Bavaria
Footballers from Munich
German footballers
Germany international footballers
Association football forwards
FC Bayern Munich footballers
German military personnel killed in World War II